Daniel "Dany" Imbert (December 17, 1952 – March 15, 2016) was a Mauritian football player who played as a forward for Racing Club and the Mauritius national football team.

Early life

Dany's father, a nurse, moved to London taking Dany with him where he was noticed by his school coach and encouraged to join Chelsea's junior team however he was not allowed to remain in England, returning to Mauritius in 1969, reluctantly.

International career

Dany is the only Mauritian international to have scored at the African Cup of Nations, as part of the 1974 squad nicknamed the "Elahee Boys" after their manager Mohammad Anwar Elahee. He is Mauritius' all-time top goal scorer with 17 goals in 53 matches.

After football

Upon retirement he worked at Mauritius Commercial Bank.

He died of a stroke on March 15, 2016, at 63 years old at a hospital near Quatre Bornes in Mauritius.

Career statistics

International goals
Scores and results list Mauritius' goal tally first.

References

1952 births
2016 deaths
Association football forwards
Mauritius international footballers
Mauritian footballers
1974 African Cup of Nations players